The 1987–88 Toto Cup Leumit was the 4th season of the third most important football tournament in Israel since its introduction. 

It was held in two stages. First, the 14 Liga Leumit teams, with Hapoel Haifa and Hapoel Jerusalem from Liga Artzit, were divided into four groups. The group winners advanced to the semi-finals, which, as was the final, were held as one-legged matches. 

The competition was won by Shimshon Tel Aviv, who beat Bnei Yehuda 4–2 in the final.

Group stage

Group A

Group B

Group C

Group D

Elimination rounds

Semifinals

Final

See also
 1987–88 Toto Cup Artzit

References

Leumit
Toto Cup Leumit
Toto Cup Leumit